Shamrock is a city in Wheeler County, Texas, United States. As of the 2010 census, the city had a total population of 1,910. The city is located in the eastern portion of the Texas Panhandle centered along the crossroads of Interstate 40 (formerly U.S. Route 66) and U.S. Route 83.

History
Located in south-central Wheeler County, Shamrock was the largest town in the county in the late 19th century. George and Dora Nickel consented to keep the first  post office in their dugout there in 1890. The mail was to be carried once a week from Mobeetie, Texas. The neighbors decided to let George name the office. His Irish-American mother had told him always to depend on a shamrock to bring him good luck, so holding true to his Irish descent, he suggested "Shamrock" for the name of the office.  When a mysterious fire destroyed his dugout, however, George Nickel's post office never opened. Mary Ruth Jones became Shamrock's first postmistress, running the Shamrock post office out of the Jones family home.

In 1902, the Chicago, Rock Island and Gulf Railway set up a station in the town, calling it "Wheeler" like the county, but later changing it back to the original name of Shamrock in 1903, which prompted the reopening of the Shamrock post office.  By 1907, the town was competing with the towns of Story and Benonine as trade centers.

The town continued its growth as other businesses moved into the city, including the county newspaper, which moved from Story and renamed itself from the Wheeler County Texan to the Shamrock Texan, several banks, and Shamrock Cotton Oil Mill.  In 1911, E. L. Woodley became the mayor of the newly incorporated city. In 1926, the discovery of oil and the operation of natural gas wells by Shamrock Gas Company helped spur the city's continuing growth. A decline in the oil industry caused the population to drop in the 1940s, but it rebounded in the next decade with the improvement of Route 66. By the 1980s, the town was home to an established modern school system, a chemical plant, oil and gas processing plants, and a hospital.

At its peak in 1930, Shamrock had a population of 3,778. Despite some rebounds, the city population continues to fluctuate.  According to the 2020 census, the city population has dropped to its lowest recorded point with 1,986 residents.  Despite this, Shamrock is the second-largest Texas city on Route 66, after Amarillo.

Geography

Shamrock is located at  (35.217116, –100.247171).

According to the United States Census Bureau, the city has a total area of 2.1 square miles (5.4 km), all of it land.

Climate

Demographics

2020 census

As of the 2020 United States census, there were 1,789 people, 850 households, and 553 families residing in the city.

2000 census
As of the census of 2000,  2,029 people, 852 households, and 550 families resided in the city. The population density was 979.7 people per square mile (378.5/km). The 1,072 housing units averaged 517.6 per square mile (200.0/km). The racial makeup of the city was 85.26% White, 4.83% African American, 1.38% Native American, 0.99% Asian, 0.20% Pacific Islander, 5.91% from other races, and 1.43% from two or more races. Hispanic or Latino residents of any race were 13.41% of the population.

Of the 852 households, 28.3% had children under the age of 18 living with them, 50.7% were married couples living together, 9.9% had a female householder with no husband present, and 35.4% were not families. About 33.0% of all households were made up of individuals, and 17.6% had someone living alone who was 65 years of age or older. The average household size was 2.33 and the average family size was 2.95.

In the city, the population was distributed as 25.3% under the age of 18, 6.3% from 18 to 24, 23.7% from 25 to 44, 22.4% from 45 to 64, and 22.3% who were 65 years of age or older. The median age was 42 years. For every 100 females, there were 87.9 males. For every 100 females age 18 and over, there were 83.1 males.

The median income for a household in the city was $25,776, and for a family was $33,542. Males had a median income of $24,688 versus $16,944 for females. The per capita income for the city was $13,724. About 22.7% of families and 21.4% of the population were below the poverty line, including 24.7% of those under age 18 and 20.0% of those age 65 or over.

Arts and culture

U-Drop Inn

In 1936, the U-Drop Inn was built at the corner of the U.S. Route 83 and the now historic Route 66. At the time of opening, the U-Drop was the only café within  of Shamrock, enjoying brisk business and becoming a successful establishment. Once considered a beautiful and impressive example of Route 66 architecture in Texas, the U-Drop Inn fell into disrepair with the decommissioning of Route 66. Referred to as "one of the most impressive examples" of Route 66 architecture by the Texas Historical Commission, the U-Drop Inn was added to the National Register of Historic Places in 1997.  In May 1999, the First National Bank of Shamrock purchased the then-closed U-Drop Inn and gave it to the city of Shamrock. With a $1.7 million federal grant, the city was able to hire a firm specializing in historical renovation to restore the building to its original condition and adapt it into a museum, visitors' center, gift shop, and the city's chamber of commerce.  The revived U-Drop Inn was featured in the 2006 animated film Cars as the inspiration for the fictional Ramone's body shop.

Pioneer West Museum

The Old Reynolds Hotel, a historic building, was saved from demolition and converted into a museum by local residents. The building with 25 rooms was turned into an exhibition hall with pioneer artifacts, typical objects of settlers, and Native American arrowheads. The exhibits range from local historical objects to a space exhibit to a military history exhibit.

Blarney Stone 

A kissable chunk  of Ireland's Blarney Stone is located in Shamrock. In 1959, a local organization sent away for the stone to preserve the town's Irish image. Irish resistance to the stone leaving its homeland led to the stone being escorted by guards and an armored truck.

Festivals and celebrations
Two annual social gatherings are organized each year to celebrate the founder's heritage. The annual St. Patrick's Celebration is held on the weekend closest to St Patrick's Day. Irish Craftfest is held annually the first weekend of October at the Shamrock Area Community Center.

In popular culture
 At the end of the film Cast Away, Chuck Nolan (Tom Hanks) is seen on US Route 83 near Interstate 40, the real-life location of Shamrock.
 In the movie Cars, Ramone's House of Body Art is based on the U-Drop-Inn in Shamrock.  
 In season two, episode one of Magnum, P.I.,  character Billy Joe Little says his sister, Carol Ann, for whom he is looking, and he are from Shamrock.
 Some parts of the movie Abilene, later named Shadows of the Past, were filmed in the Shamrock area.  Ernest Borgnine played the character Hotis Brown.
 In the pilot episode of The X-Files,  Special Agent Fox Mulder notes similarities in the death of Karen Swenson and others from across the country, including one death in Shamrock

Education
The City of Shamrock is served by the Shamrock Independent School District and home to the Shamrock High School Irish.

Infrastructure

Major highways
 U.S. Route 66
 Interstate 40
 U.S. Route 83

Notable people
Phil Cates, former state representative for District 66, resided in Shamrock from 1975 to 1979
Richard P. Crandall, American nuclear physicist; author of They All Told the Truth: The Anti-Gravity Papers
Bill Mack, singer and songwriter
Gene Price, songwriter, musician and vocalist; longtime songwriting associate of Buck Owens
Killian "killer' Strömm, songwriter, musician and vocalist; fictional leader of die Strömms and family is from Shamrock. die Strömms
Larry Salmans, Kansas state legislator
Holice Turnbow, artist and quilter
Eugene Worley, reared in Shamrock; U.S. representative from Texas's 18th congressional district from 1941 to 1950

References

External links

 
 Shamrock EDC website

Cities in Wheeler County, Texas
Cities in Texas
Populated places established in 1890
1890 establishments in Texas